The Speaker of the Wyoming House of Representatives is the presiding officer of the Wyoming House of Representatives.  The Speaker has historically been a member of the majority party who is the de facto leader of their party.  The current House Speaker is Albert Sommers of Pinedale.

Speakers of the Wyoming House of Representatives

References

See also
Wyoming House of Representatives
Wyoming Legislature

Wyoming Legislature